was an American artist.

Life
Eitaro Ishigaki was born in Taiji, Wakayama, Japan in 1893. At the age of sixteen he emigrated to America in to live with his father in Seattle. A year later, in 1910, they moved to California, and in 1912, Ishigaki moved to San Francisco. There he met many artists, including Gertrude Boyle, and attended class at both the William Best School of Art and at the San Francisco Institute of Art. Eitaro Ishigaki was a founding member of the John Reed Club and a member of the Federal Art Project as well. In the 1930s, he was also involved in the Artists Congress and other WPA activities.

In 1937, he painted two murals at the Harlem Courthouse, American Independence and Emancipation. In 1938, the New York City Council ruled both of them offensive and murals were removed.

His painting, Man on the Horse (1932), depicted a plain-clothed Chinese guerrilla confronting the Japanese army, heavily equipped with airplanes and warships. His other painting, Flight (1937), depicted two Chinese women escaping Japanese bombing, running with three children past one man lying dead on the ground.

During World War II, he worked for the United States Office of War Information. In 1951, Ishigaki was arrested by the FBI and deported to Japan with his wife, Ayako Ishigaki, because of his communist connections. He died in Japan seven years later.

Recognition 
His work is held by the Art Institute of Chicago. In 1997 and 2013, the Museum of Modern Art, Wakayama held commemorative exhibitions of his works. His work is also located in the Ishigaki Eitaro Memorial Museum in Wakayama, Japan.

Works
 "Undefeated Arm" (cover) New Masses(July 1929)
 "May Day" New Masses (May 1930)

See also
 Japanese resistance to the Empire of Japan in World War II

References

Further reading

ShiPu Wang (2017). "By Proxy of His Black Heroes: Eitarō Ishigaki and the Battles for Equality." The Other American Moderns. Matsura, Ishigaki, Noda, Hayakawa. Penn State University Press. .

1893 births
1958 deaths
Federal Art Project artists
American muralists
American artists of Japanese descent
Japanese emigrants to the United States
20th-century American painters
American male painters
People of the United States Office of War Information
People from Wakayama Prefecture
People deported from the United States
Artists from Wakayama Prefecture
20th-century American male artists